The 2019 World Wrestling Championships were held in Nur-Sultan, Kazakhstan from 14 September to 22 September 2019.

The tournament served as qualification for the 2020 Summer Olympics, the top six wrestlers from each category earned their NOCs a qualification.

Medal table

Team ranking

Medal summary

Men's freestyle

Men's Greco-Roman

Women's freestyle

Participating nations
872 competitors from 95 nations participated.

 (3)
 (7)
 (1)
 (2)
 (15)
 (3)
 (8)
 (28)
 (2)
 (26)
 (6)
 (19)
 (1)
 (2)
 (18)
 (1)
 (1)
 (29)
 (7)
 (8)
 (1)
 (5)
 (12)
 (7)
 (3)
 (3)
 (9)
 (5)
 (1)
 (7)
 (10)
 (20) 
 (23)
 (2)
 (5)
 (4)
 (2)
 (2)
 (2)
 (18)
 (30)
 (20)
 (6)
 (10)
 (1)
 (30)
 (30)
 (1)
 (22)
 (2)
 (1)
 (11)
 (6)
 (19)
 (21)
 (4)
 (1)
 (2)
 (4)
 (6)
 (8)
 (4)
 (6)
 (3)
 (1)
 (1)
 (1)
 (1)
 (21)
 (2)
 (3)
 (2)
 (14)
 (30)
 (2)
 (6)
 (1)
 (3)
 (1)
 (30)
 (6)
 (12)
 (6)
 (1)
 (7)
 (2)
 (30)
 (7)
 (1)
 (30)
 (30)
 (27)
 (10)
 (7)
 (1)

References

External links
Results book

 
World Wrestling Championships
World Championships
Wrestling Championships
International wrestling competitions hosted by Kazakhstan
Sport in Astana
World Wrestling Championships